The 1986 Virginia Slims of San Diego was a women's tennis tournament played on outdoor hard courts at the San Diego Hilton Beach & Tennis Resort in San Diego, California in the United States and was part of the 1986 Virginia Slims World Championship Series. It was the third edition of the tournament and ran from July 28 through August 3, 1986. Unseeded Melissa Gurney won the singles title.

Finals

Singles
 Melissa Gurney defeated  Stephanie Rehe 6–2, 6–4
 It was Gurney's 2nd singles title of the year and of her career.

Doubles
 Beth Herr /  Alycia Moulton defeated  Elise Burgin /  Rosalyn Fairbank 5–7, 6–2, 6–4

References

External links
 ITF tournament edition details
 Tournament draws
 Tournament fact sheet

Virginia Slims of San Diego
Southern California Open
Virg
Virg